USS Speedway (SP-407) was a United States Navy patrol vessel in commission from 1917 to 1919.
 
Speedway was built as a private motorboat of the same name by the Gas Engine & Power Company and the Charles L. Seabury Company at Morris Heights in the Bronx, New York.
On May 2, 1917, the U.S. Navy acquired her under a free lease from her owner, W. Blair of New York City, for use as a section patrol boat during World War I. She was commissioned as USS Speedway (SP-407) on May 3.

Speedway served on patrol duties along the Mid-Atlantic coast of the United States through the end of World War I. The Navy returned her to her owner on February 14, 1919.

Notes

References

NavSource Online: Section Patrol Craft Photo Archive: Speedway (SP 407)

Patrol vessels of the United States Navy
World War I patrol vessels of the United States
Ships built in Morris Heights, Bronx